Capital Gearing Trust is a large British investment trust which invests in a broad range of equities, bonds, commodities and cash. Established in 1973, the company is a constituent of the FTSE 250 Index. It has been managed since 1982 by Capital Gearing Asset Management, which is an employee ownership trust. The chairman is Jean Matterson.

References

External links
 Official site

Financial services companies established in 1973
Investment trusts of the United Kingdom